In April, 1821, prior to the first meeting of the 17th Congress, Representative-elect James Duncan (DR) from  resigned.  A special election was held to fill the resulting vacancy on October 9, 1821.

Election results

Findlay took his seat December 12, 1821

See also
List of special elections to the United States House of Representatives

References

Pennsylvania 1821 05
Pennsylvania 1821 05
1821 05
Pennsylvania 05
United States House of Representatives 05
United States House of Representatives 1821 05